Limehouse is a district in London.

Limehouse may also refer to:

Places
Limehouse, Ontario, Canada
Limehouse, South Carolina, U.S.

United Kingdom
Limehouse station, a National Rail and Docklands Light Railway station in Limehouse
Limehouse railway station (1840–1926), a railway station in Limehouse, London, on the London and Blackwall Railway
Limehouse Link tunnel, a tunnel under Limehouse
Limehouse Cut, a canal in the East End of London
Limehouse Basin, a basin connecting the Regent's Canal and the River Thames
Limehouse (UK Parliament constituency), a borough constituency centred on the Limehouse district of the East End of London
Limehouse (London County Council constituency), a constituency used for elections to the London County Council between 1919 and 1949

Other uses
Limehouse (horse), (foaled 2001), an American Thoroughbred racehorse
Limehouse Declaration, the announcement of the formation of the Social Democractic Party in the United Kingdom, made at Limehouse, London
Limehouse (play), a 2017 play based on the discussions leading up to the Limehouse Declaration

See also
Limehouse Blues (disambiguation)